Annie Hall (1949/50– 8 November 2019) was a British businesswoman who served as High Sheriff of Derbyshire for the year 2017–2018. She was the first woman to be president of Derbyshire Chamber of Commerce. She was also vice-chair of Derbyshire Mental Health NHS Trust, chair of the council of Derby Cathedral, and a trustee of the charity Foundation Derbyshire.

Hall was raised in Wincanton, Somerset, and educated at a Catholic school nearby. She subsequently studied psychiatric nursing. She married Michael Hall, and the couple subsequently moved from Somerset to Derbyshire, where they set up a business manufacturing industrial winches.

She died on 8 November 2019 after being swept away by the flooded River Derwent at Rowsley, following a period of unusually heavy rainfall. The car she and her husband were travelling in was overturned by floodwater. He survived by managing to hold on to a lamppost.

Hall was 69 at the time of her death, and was a resident of Ashford-in-the-Water.

References

External links 

 Video of Hall opening a fete in her role as High Sheriff

2019 deaths
Natural disaster deaths in England
Deaths by drowning in the United Kingdom
Deaths in floods
British business executives
High Sheriffs of Derbyshire
Year of birth missing
Place of birth missing
People from Derbyshire
People from Wincanton